Mathiveri (Dhivehi: މަތިވެރި) is one of the eight inhabited islands of Alif Alif Atoll.

Island Code U-05
Postal Code 09040

Geography
Mathiveri is located at the central area of North ari atoll.

Demography

The population of Mathiveri as of September 2020 are 991 in total.

Governance
There is a police station on the island, and a magistrate court to provide law enforcement.

Island council
The current Island Council members are:-
1- Ahmed Aslam (MDP) President of the Council.
2- Ali Naafiz (MDP) Vice President of the Council.
3- Hussain Nihaan (PPM) member of the council.
4- Shifza Ibrahim (MDP) member of the council.
5- Mariyam Shaaniya (PPM) member of the council.

Economy
Main sources of economy of the island are Fishing and tourism. The island have Fishing Boats which mainly involving in the yellow fin tuna fishing industry. All the fishing boats are registered and licences under fish processing and  exporting company. these companies export the raw fish products to European countries.

There are 10 guest houses in Mathiveri. Tourists across the world are used to visit the island and stay those guest houses. And many of the people are working nearby tourist island resorts.

Healthcare
Mathiveri Health Centre is the only health service provider in the island. The health centre has a medical officer and two registered nurses and nearly 15 staff members. The health centre is opened for 16 hours in a day.

Education
There is a school (up to grade 10) on the island to educate the children of the community. The principal of the school is Mr. Mohamed Siraj.

Sports
Football and handball are the main sports in Mathiveri. There is a football ground in the south side of the island. The pitch is not good for players because of the sandy soil. There are huge football competitions with participating teams from outside Mathiveri. They are played on an artificial grass football pitch on the island. Handball is the current top sport played among the woman of Mathiveri.

References

Islands of the Maldives
Alif Alif Atoll